The following are lists of Star Studios films by decade:

Lists 
As Fox Star Studios
 List of Fox Star Studios films (2009–2022)

As Star Studios
 List of Star Studios films

External links 

20th Century Studios
20th Century Studios